WCDA (106.3 FM, "Hits 106.3") is a radio station licensed to Versailles, Kentucky, United States, broadcasting to the greater Lexington metropolitan area. It plays adult top 40 music, as it is a Mediabase Hot AC reporter.  It is owned by L.M. Communications. The station's studios are located at Triangle Center in downtown Lexington, and its transmitter is located atop Lexington Financial Center, also in downtown.

Current programming
As of January 2018:
 Mandy And Jimmy

References

External links
Official site of Hits 106.3

CDA
Adult top 40 radio stations in the United States
1973 establishments in Kentucky
Radio stations established in 1973
Versailles, Kentucky